Abramo Fimo Kenneth Organski (12 May 1923 – 6 March 1998) was Professor of Political Science at the University of Michigan, the founder of Power transition theory and a co-founder of Decision Insights, Inc.  His pioneering work spanned several decades, and focused on specific aspects of world politics, including: political demography; political development; and grand strategy. He was the author of World Politics, The Stages of Political Development, The War Ledger, Birth, Death and Taxes, and The $36 Billion Bargain.  Other publications are available in scholarly journals.

A.F.K. Organski was born in Rome, Italy. As a youth, he attended the Ginnasio Liceo Torquato Tasso.  He went to the United States fleeing the anti-Jewish laws of the Benito Mussolini regime and later served with the American armed forces in the Pacific theater from 1943 to 1945. He became an American citizen in 1944. After World War II, he settled in New York City, and earned his B.A. (1947), M.A. (1948), and Ph.D. (1951) degrees from New York University.  In 1952 he started teaching at the Brooklyn College, moving in 1964 to the University of Michigan, where he became professor of political science and senior research scientist in the Institute for Social Research.  He co-founded Decision Insights, a consulting firm focused on introducing scientific rigor to the execution of policy and decision making in government and business.

He introduced Power transition theory in 1958.

Political scientist Bruce Bueno de Mesquita, one of Organski's former students, credits Organski's work as his primary inspiration for the selectorate theory.

References 

1923 births
1998 deaths
American political writers
American male non-fiction writers
American political philosophers
American political scientists
University of Michigan faculty
Brooklyn College faculty
20th-century American male writers
Italian emigrants to the United States
New York University alumni
20th-century political scientists